Wilbur Frank Lansing Jr. (January 13, 1929 – January 23, 2000) was an American baseball pitcher in the Negro leagues. He played with the Newark/Houston Eagles from 1947 to 1950.

Lansing attended Dover High School and joined the Eagles in 1947.

References

External links
 and Seamheads

1929 births
2000 deaths
Newark Eagles players
Houston Eagles players
Baseball players from New Jersey
Baseball pitchers
People from Dover, New Jersey
Sportspeople from Morris County, New Jersey
20th-century African-American sportspeople